The 2023 Deutsche Tourenwagen Masters will be the thirty-seventh season of the premier German touring car championship and also the twenty-fourth season under the moniker of Deutsche Tourenwagen Masters since the series' resumption in 2000. It will be the third season of the DTM to be run under Group GT3 regulations, and the promoter will be ADAC instead of ITR.

Teams and drivers
All teams competed with tyres supplied by Pirelli. On 22 February all participating teams were announced.

Race calendar

References

External links
  

Deutsche Tourenwagen Masters seasons
Deutsche Tourenwagen Masters
Deutsche Tourenwagen Masters
Deutsche Tourenwagen Masters